Nikolaos Angelopoulos was a Greek sprinter. He competed in the 200 meter race at the 1980 Summer Olympics in Moscow, USSR.

References

1958 births
Living people
Greek male sprinters
Olympic athletes of Greece
Athletes (track and field) at the 1980 Summer Olympics
Athletes from Patras
20th-century Greek people